The Rugby League Ipswich is a rugby league football competition based in Ipswich, Queensland. It is under the administration of the Queensland Rugby League through the South East Queensland Division, which also administers the Brisbane and Gold Coast competitions.

Representative team

Selected players from the Ipswich Rugby League, represented Ipswich in a representative side called Combined Ipswich, also called Ipswich Diggers, whose teams compete in the statewide competitions the Cyril Connell Cup and the Mal Meninga Cup.

Seasons

Premiership winners
A list of premiers and Grand Final results since 1980.

Ipswich Rugby League Club Teams
The Ipswich Rugby League currently has 12 clubs, for senior and junior. All clubs are in the junior division but not all are in the senior division.

The clubs currently in the senior division include:
 Fassifern Bombers
 Ipswich Swift's RLFC Bluebirds
 Norths Tigers
 Goodna Eagles
 West End Bulldogs
 Brothers Ipswich 
 Rosewood Roosters
 Karalee Tornadoes
 Brisbane Valley Bulls

These clubs are currently fielding teams just in the junior division, however, some have fielded senior teams in the past:
 Lowood Stags
 Laidley Lions
 Springfield Panthers
 Redbank Plains Bears

Previous clubs in the league include the Eastern Cobras.

See also

Rugby League Competitions in Australia

References

External links and Sources

 Rugby League Week at State Library of NSW Research and Collections
 Ipswich Rugby League : Senior A Grade Premiers 1910-2009, Compiled by J.E. Christison, 2010, . 
 The centenary of the greatest game under the sun : one hundred years of Rugby League in Queensland, Prof. Maxwell Howell, Celebrity Books, 2008.

Rugby league competitions in Queensland
Queensland Rugby League
Sport in Ipswich, Queensland
Recurring sporting events established in 1910
1910 establishments in Australia
Sports leagues established in 1910